Sineenat Phocharoen (born 19 May 1995) is a Thai volleyball player. She is a member of the Thailand women's national volleyball team.

Clubs
  Samut Prakan (2012–2013)
  Sisaket (2013–2015)
  Thai-Denmark Nongrua (2015–2017)
  King-Bangkok (2018)
  3BB Nakornnont (2018–2019)

Awards

Individuals

Clubs
 2013–14 Thailand League -  Runner up, with Sisaket
 2016 PSL Invitational Cup -  Co-champion, with Est Cola
 2018–19 Thailand League -  Third, with 3BB Nakornnont
 2019 Thai–Denmark Super League -  Third, with 3BB Nakornnont

National team

U23 team 
 2015 Asian Championship -  Silver Medal

References

External links
 FIVB Biography

1995 births
Living people
Sineenat Phocharoen
Sineenat Phocharoen